Lydia Gilmore is a 1915 American drama silent film directed by Hugh Ford and Edwin S. Porter and written by Hugh Ford and Henry Arthur Jones. The film stars Pauline Frederick, Vincent Serrano, Thomas Holding, Robert Cain, Helen Lutrell and Jack Curtis. The film was released on December 26, 1915, by Paramount Pictures.

Plot

Cast
Pauline Frederick as Lydia Gilmore
Vincent Serrano as Dr. Gilmore
Thomas Holding as Ralph Benham
Robert Cain as Mr. Stracey
Helen Lutrell as Mrs. Stracey
Jack Curtis as Master Ned Gilmore
M.W. Rale as Detective

References

External links 
 

1915 films
1910s English-language films
Silent American drama films
1915 drama films
Paramount Pictures films
Films directed by Hugh Ford
Films directed by Edwin S. Porter
American black-and-white films
American silent feature films
1910s American films